Głogów is a town in Lower Silesian Voivodeship, south-west Poland.

Głogów may also refer to:

Głogów Małopolski, a town in Subcarpathian Voivodeship (south-east Poland)
Głogów, Masovian Voivodeship (east-central Poland)